African or Africans may refer to: 
 Anything from or pertaining to the continent of Africa:
 People who are native to Africa, descendants of natives of Africa, or individuals who trace their ancestry to indigenous inhabitants of Africa
 Ethnic groups of Africa
 Demographics of Africa
 African diaspora
 African, an adjective referring to something of, from, or related to the African Union 
 Citizenship of the African Union
 Demographics of the African Union
Africanfuturism
 African art

 African jazz (disambiguation)
 African cuisine
 African culture
 African languages
 African music
 African Union
 African lion, a lion population in Africa

Books and radio
 The African (essay), a story by French author J. M. G. Le Clézio
 The African (Conton novel), a novel by William Farquhar Conton
 The African (Courlander novel), a novel by Harold Courlander
 The Africans (radio program)

Music
 "African", a song by Peter Tosh from his 1977 album Equal Rights
The Africans (band)

See also 
 
 
 Geography of Africa
 Africana (disambiguation)
 Africanus (disambiguation)
 Demographics of Africa

Language and nationality disambiguation pages